A hobby is an activity, interest, or pastime that is undertaken for pleasure or relaxation, done during one's own leisure time.

Hobbies

Outdoors and sports

Educational hobbies

Collection hobbies

Indoors

Outdoors

Competitive hobbies

Indoors

Outdoors

Observation hobbies

Indoors

Outdoors

References

External links 
 

Entertainment lists